American singer-songwriter Michelle Branch has released five studio albums, one video album, two extended plays, and twelve singles (including two as a featured artist). She released her debut album, Broken Bracelet, through the independent label imprint Twin Dragon Records in 2000 before signing a recording contract with Maverick Records the following year. In August 2001, Branch released her second studio album and major-label debut, The Spirit Room. It peaked at number twenty-eight on the Billboard 200 and featured three Top 40 singles on the Billboard Hot 100, including the top 10 hit "All You Wanted" and her debut single, "Everywhere", which entered the top 20 of multiple international record charts. The album has been certified 2× Platinum by the Recording Industry Association of America (RIAA) for selling over two million copies in the United States. Branch has sold 3 million certified copies of her albums in the United States.

Branch's third album, Hotel Paper, was released June 21, 2003. The album was a commercial success, peaking at number two on the Billboard 200 and spawned two charting singles: "Are You Happy Now?", which peaked at number sixteen on the Billboard Hot 100, and "Breathe", which peaked at number thirty-six. The album has been certified Platinum by the RIAA for selling over one million copies. From 2005 through 2007, Branch recorded with fellow musician Jessica Harp as the country duo The Wreckers. Branch's solo career resumed in 2009 with the release of her country single "Sooner or Later" and the extended play, Everything Comes and Goes.

Following a series of creative disputes and label disruptions that resulted in Everything Comes and Goes being reduced from a full-length album to an extended play and her subsequent album, West Coast Time, going unreleased, Branch released "Loud Music" from the extended play of the same name in 2011 through Reprise Records. In 2015, Branch signed a new record deal with Verve Records and in 2017, she released her fourth album and first for that label, Hopeless Romantic.

Studio albums

Reissues

Extended plays

Singles

As lead artist

As featured artist

Other contributions

Videos

Video albums

Music videos

Notes

References

Discography
Discographies of American artists
Pop music discographies